Christian Thomas (born 31 March 1965) is a retired West German long jumper.

Thomas represented the sports club TV Heppenheim. His personal best jump was 8.21 metres, achieved in July 1994 in Germering. This ranks him tenth among German long jumpers, behind Lutz Dombrowski, Frank Paschek, Josef Schwarz, Henry Lauterbach, Marco Delonge, Konstantin Krause, Dietmar Haaf, Ron Beer and Uwe Lange, and equal to Georg Ackermann and Nils Winter.

Achievements

References

1965 births
Living people
West German male long jumpers